Ashmizan (also Romanized as Āshmīzān; also known as Āchmīzān) is a village in Kamazan-e Sofla Rural District, Zand District, Malayer County, Hamadan Province, Iran. At the 2006 census, its population was 133, in 32 families.

Geography 
Ashmizan can be found using the coordinates, 34.1049° N, 48.8856° E.

References 

Populated places in Malayer County